Maurice Timothy Dooling Sr. (October 12, 1860 – November 4, 1924) was a United States district judge of the United States District Court for the Northern District of California.

Education and career

Dooling was born in a mining camp near Moores Flat, California, to Elizabeth Mary and Timothy Dooling, Irish immigrants who were pioneers in the territory. Maurice received an Artium Baccalaureus degree in 1880 and an Artium Magister degree in 1881 from Saint Mary's College of California (in San Francisco at that time). He was a teacher at St. Mary's College from 1881 to 1883, and read law to enter the bar in 1885. He then served as a Democratic Party member of the California State Assembly from the San Benito County district from 1885 to 1887, and as a Judge of the Superior Court of San Benito County from 1897 to 1913. He received a Doctor of Philosophy from Santa Clara College (now Santa Clara University) in 1903.

Unsuccessful judicial race

In 1906, Dooling ran for election to the position of Associate Justice of the California Court of Appeal for the First District on the Democratic ticket but lost by a slim margin to Republicans Frank H. Kerrigan and S. P. Hall.

Federal judicial service

On July 18, 1913, Dooling was nominated by President Woodrow Wilson to a seat on the United States District Court for the Northern District of California vacated by Judge John J. De Haven. Dooling was confirmed by the United States Senate on July 28, 1913, and received his commission the same day. Dooling served in that capacity until his death in San Francisco on November 4, 1924, from a relapse caused by overexertion, after suffering influenza the previous January.

Family

Dooling's son, Maurice T. Dooling Jr., was appointed to the Supreme Court of California in 1960.

References

Sources
 
  Article by Dettweiler, Alma Dooling. "Maurice T. Dooling, 1860-1924".

External links
 
 Join California Maurice T. Dooling

1860 births
1924 deaths
California state court judges
Superior court judges in the United States
Democratic Party members of the California State Assembly
Judges of the United States District Court for the Northern District of California
United States district court judges appointed by Woodrow Wilson
20th-century American judges
United States federal judges admitted to the practice of law by reading law
People from San Benito County, California
Lawyers from Los Angeles
California pioneers
19th-century American politicians